Bobrovník is a village and municipality in Liptovský Mikuláš District in the Žilina Region of northern Slovakia.

History
In historical records the village was first mentioned in 1273.

Geography
The municipality lies at an altitude of 568 metres and covers an area of 6.780 km². It has a population of about 143 people.

Sights
The Havránok open-air museum with a reconstructed Celtic hill fort is situated 2 km from the village.

Genealogical resources

The records for genealogical research are available at the state archive "Statny Archiv in Bytca, Slovakia"

 Roman Catholic church records (births/marriages/deaths): 1764-1918 (parish B)

See also
 List of municipalities and towns in Slovakia

External links/Sources
https://web.archive.org/web/20071116010355/http://www.statistics.sk/mosmis/eng/run.html
Surnames of living people in Bobrovnik

Villages and municipalities in Liptovský Mikuláš District